Justice Porter may refer to:

Alexander Porter (1785–1844), associate justice of the Louisiana Supreme Court
Donald James Porter (1921–2003), associate justice of the South Dakota Supreme Court
James W. Porter (judge) (1887–1959), associate justice of the Idaho Supreme Court
John K. Porter (1819–1892), judge of the New York Court of Appeals
Newton Hazelton Porter (1877–1945), associate justice of the New Jersey Supreme Court
Thomas Porter (Vermont politician) (1734–1833), associate justice of the Vermont Supreme Court
Silas Wright Porter (1857–1937), associate justice of the Kansas Supreme Court

See also
Judge Porter (disambiguation)